African Parks is a non-governmental organization (NGO) focused on conservation, established in 2000 and headquartered in Johannesburg, South Africa. It was founded as the African Parks Management and Finance Company, a private company, then underwent structural changes to become an NGO called African Parks Foundation, and later renamed African Parks Network. The organization manages national parks and protected areas throughout Africa, in collaboration with governments and surrounding communities. African Parks manages 18 protected areas in 11 countries as of August 2020, and employs more than 1,100 rangers. Michael Eustace, Peter Fearnhead, Paul Fentener van Vlissingen, Anthony Hall-Martin, and Mavuso Msimang are credited as co-founders; Fearnhead continues to serve as chief executive officer. Prince Harry was appointed African Parks' president in late 2017.

Overview
The Johannesburg-based nonprofit conservation organization African Parks manages national parks and protected areas throughout Africa, in collaboration with governments and surrounding communities. In addition to park management, the organization: trains rangers, actively manages and protects wildlife, works to reduce poaching and increase law enforcement and tourism, fundraises, improves infrastructure; and supports local residents. African Parks motto is "a business approach to conservation".

African Parks currently manages 22 protected areas in 14 countries, including W National Park and Pendjari National Park in Benin, Chinko in Central African Republic, Ennedi Natural and Cultural Reserve, Siniaka-Minia Faunal Reserve, and Zakouma National Park in Chad, Boma National Park and Bandingilo National Park in South Sudan, Garamba National Park in the Democratic Republic of the Congo, Liwonde National Park, Majete Wildlife Reserve, Mangochi Forest Reserve, and Nkhotakota Wildlife Reserve in Malawi, Bazaruto Archipelago National Park in Mozambique, Odzala-Kokoua National Park in the Republic of the Congo, Akagera National Park and Nyungwe Forest in Rwanda,Matusadona National Park in Zimbabwe, Iona National Park in Angola, and Bangweulu Wetlands, Liuwa Plain National Park and Kafue National Park in Zambia.

African Parks employs more than 1,100 rangers, as of 2020. According to The Washington Post, the organization "has the largest counter-poaching force of any private organization on the continent". Peter Fearnhead co-founded and continues to serve as African Parks chief executive officer (CEO). Michael Eustace, Paul Fentener van Vlissingen, Anthony Hall-Martin, and Mavuso Msimang are also credited as co-founders. Msimang, who once served on the Military High Command of Umkonto we Sizwe and is former CEO of South African National Parks, is  Emeritus Board Member of the organisation. Prince Harry, who previously assisted with African Parks' 2016–2017 elephant translocation project in Malawi, was named president in December 2017. Robert-Jan van Ogtrop serves as chairman, as of December 2017. Other board members include Hansjörg Wyss who founded the Wyss Campaign for Nature.

African Parks has received funding from the European Union, Adessium Foundation, Global Environment Facility, Howard G. Buffett Foundation, International Bank for Reconstruction and Development, National Geographic Society, Nationale Postcode Loterij, Swedish Postcode Lottery, United States Agency for International Development (USAID), United States Fish and Wildlife Service (USFWS), Walton Family Foundation, World Wide Fund for Nature, and Wyss Foundation, among others. A financial endowment funded by Fentener van Vlissingen directs approximately US$700,000 towards African Parks' annual operations. The organization's budget was approximately US$35 million in 2016.

History
African Parks was established in 2000 as the African Parks Management and Finance Company, a privately held company. Msimang and Hall-Martin, who previously served as director and CEO of South African National Parks, respectively, held director roles at the newly formed company, as did Fentener van Vlissingen. Fearnhead, then head of commercial development for South African National Parks, initially served on the African Parks' advisory board. Plans for the company started forming after Fentener van Vlissingen met with Nelson Mandela in 1998, and early supporters included the U.S. Department of State and World Bank.

The first protected areas to be managed by the company were Majete Wildlife Reserve and Liuwa Plain National Park, starting in 2003. African Parks had planned to manage Zambia's Sioma Ngwezi National Park, but efforts stalled. The holding company was moved from Johannesburg to the Netherlands, and went through some structural changes. Eustace, Fearnhead, Hall-Martin, and Msimang became minority shareholders in African Parks B.V., and continued to serve on the company's board. The African Parks Foundation was created in the Netherlands and became the company's only shareholder. African Parks B.V. was liquidated in 2004.

During this transition, African Parks entered into agreements to manage Ethiopia's Nechisar National Park and Omo National Park in 2004 and 2005, respectively. However, the organization announced plans to terminate these two agreements in December 2007, and stopped managing parks in Ethiopia in 2008. African Parks had also entered into agreements to manage Garamba, as well as two Sudanese marine parks in Dungonab Bay and Sanganeb Atoll. These agreements did not give the organization full, long-term control, like most of their other contracts. More internal changes were made to African Parks after Fentener van Vlissingen died in 2006. The organization's headquarters returned in Africa, and African representation returned to the board.

The organization began managing Akagera with the Rwanda Development Board in 2009, Zakouma in 2010, and Chinko in 2014. African Parks entered into a memorandum of understanding with Chad's government in February 2015 to establish Ennedi as a protected area, which became a Natural and Cultural Reserve. Malawi's government entered into agreements for African Parks to start managing Liwonde and Nkhotakota in August 2015. The Wyss Foundation funded African Parks' lion reintroduction project in Akagera in 2015. During 2016–2017, African Parks worked to relocate 500 elephants and other animals from Liwonde and Majete to Nkhotakota. Prince Harry assisted with the translocation, which was done in partnership with the Malawian Department of National Parks and Wildlife, and funded largely by the Nationale Postcode Loterij.

In March 2017, African Parks received $65 million from the Wyss Foundation to fund conservation efforts in Malawi's Liwonde National Park and Majete and Nkhotakota Wildlife Reserves, as well as Rwanda's Akagera National Park, and supported the addition of up to five other protected areas to African Parks' management portfolio. African Parks entered into a ten-year agreement in mid-2017 to help manage Benin's Pendjari National Park, then agreed to manage Mozambique's Bazaruto Archipelago National Park in December. In 2018, the organization signed an agreement to manage Ennedi Natural and Cultural Reserve.

References

 
Nature conservation in Africa
Nature conservation organizations based in Africa
National park administrators
Organizations established in 2000
Organisations based in South Africa